Saint-Chrysostome is a municipality in south-west Quebec, Canada in the regional county municipality of Haut-Saint-Laurent in the Montérégie administrative region.  The municipality was created by the amalgamation of Saint-Chrysostome village with the parish of Saint-Jean-Chrysostome on September 29, 1999. The population as of the Canada 2011 Census was 2,522.

Geography

Communities
The following locations reside within the municipality's boundaries:
Aubrey – a hamlet located on the west shore of Rivière-des-Anglais.

Lakes & Rivers
The following waterways pass through or are situated within the municipality's boundaries:
Rivière des Anglais – flows in a south-north direction.
Rivière Noire (Mouth ) – feeds into Rivière des Anglais.

Demographics

Population

Language

See also
 Le Haut-Saint-Laurent Regional County Municipality
 English River (Chateauguay River tributary)
 Noire River (English River tributary)
 List of municipalities in Quebec

References

External links
Saint-Chrysostome official website
The Russeltown Flatts Church

Municipalities in Quebec
Incorporated places in Le Haut-Saint-Laurent Regional County Municipality
Designated places in Quebec